The following events occurred in October 1962:

October 1, 1962 (Monday)
Netherlands New Guinea was transferred to United Nations Temporary Executive Authority, until May 1963.
Four Soviet Foxtrot submarines, armed with nuclear torpedoes, departed bases on the Kola Peninsula in anticipation of a confrontation with the United States over Cuba.
James Meredith, the first black student to enroll at the all-white University of Mississippi, registered for classes while escorted by U.S. Marshals. Meredith's first class was in Colonial History, and only 12 of the 19 students registered attended.
U.S. Army General Maxwell Taylor became the new Chairman of the Joint Chiefs of Staff.
Tropical storm "Daisy" was studied by Project Mercury operations activities for its possible effects on the Mercury-Atlas 8 (MA-8) mission, but flight preparations continued.
Air Force Space Systems Division revised the Development Plan for the Gemini launch vehicle. The budget was raised to $181.3 million. Cost increases in work on the vertical test facility at Martin's Baltimore plant, on the conversion of pad 19 at Cape Canaveral, and on aerospace ground equipment had already generated a budget increase to $172.6 million during September. The new Development Plan also indicated that the first launch date had slipped to December 1963.

Johnny Carson took over as the permanent host of NBC's The Tonight Show, a position that he would hold for 30 years. After Groucho Marx introduced him at 11:30 pm, Carson and his sidekick Ed McMahon would share the stage with the first guests, Joan Crawford, Rudy Vallee, Ned Brooks (of Meet the Press), Tony Bennett, the Phoenix Singers and Tom Pedi. Carson would host his last Tonight show on May 22, 1992. Earlier in the day on NBC, at 2:00 pm, another famous host made his debut on The Merv Griffin Show; Griffin's first guest was comedian Shelley Berman.
Born: Esai Morales, American actor; in Brooklyn

October 2, 1962 (Tuesday)
A twin-engined Saudi Air Force Fairchild C-123 Provider, said to have been sent by Prince Hassan to Royal supporters in Yemen, and laden with American-made arms and ammunition, defected to Egypt. Its three crew members were granted political asylum.
Born: Brian Holm, Danish road cyclist; in Copenhagen
Died: Heinrich Deubel, 72, former commandant of Dachau concentration camp

October 3, 1962 (Wednesday)

Mercury-Atlas 8 (MA-8), designated Sigma 7, was launched from Cape Canaveral with astronaut Wally Schirra as the pilot for a scheduled six-orbit flight. Two major modifications had been made to the Mercury spacecraft to eliminate difficulties that had occurred during the John Glenn and Scott Carpenter flights. The reaction control system was modified to disarm the high-thrust jets and allow the use of low-thrust jets only in the manual operational mode to conserve fuel. A second modification involved the addition of two high frequency antennas mounted onto the retro package to assist and maintain spacecraft and ground communication throughout this flight. Schirra termed his six-orbit mission a "textbook flight." About the only difficulty experienced was attaining the correct pressure suit temperature adjustment. The astronaut became quite warm during the early orbits, but at a subsequent press conference he reported there had been many days at Cape Canaveral when he had been much hotter sitting under a tent on the beach. To study fuel conservation methods, a considerable amount of drifting was programed during the MA-8 mission. This included 118 minutes during the fourth and fifth orbits and 18 minutes during the third orbit. Since drift error was slight, attitude fuel consumption was no problem. At the start of the reentry operation there was a 78 percent supply in both the automatic and manual tanks, enabling Schirra to use the automatic mode during reentry. Schirra stated that he and the spacecraft could have continued for much longer. The flight was the most successful to that time. Besides the camera experiment, nine ablative material samples were laminated onto the cylindrical neck of the spacecraft, and radiation-sensitive emulsion packs were placed on each side of the astronaut's couch. The MA-8 launch was relayed via the Telstar 1 satellite to television audiences in Western Europe. Schirra was the fifth American astronaut, and ninth person, to travel into outer space.
Manned Spacecraft Center (MSC) published the Gemini Program Instrumentation Requirements Document (PIRD), the basis for integrating the world-wide Manned Space Flight Network to support the Gemini program. In compiling PIRD, MSC had received the assistance of other NASA installations and Department of Defense components responsible for constructing, maintaining, and operating the network.
At a mechanical systems coordination meeting, McDonnell presented its final evaluation of the feasibility of substituting straight tube brazed connections for threaded joints as the external connections on all components of the Gemini spacecraft propulsion systems. McDonnell had begun testing the brazing process on June 26, 1962. Following its presentation, McDonnell was directed to make the change, which had the advantages of reducing leak paths and decreasing the total weight of propulsion systems.
A steam boiler explosion at a New York Telephone Company building in Manhattan killed twenty-one people and injured 70. The blast happened at 12:07 pm while employees were dining in the building's cafeteria, sending the boiler from the basement into the cafeteria, then out through a wall.
The San Francisco Giants beat the Los Angeles Dodgers, 6-4, to win the deciding game of a best-of-three playoff for the National League pennant. The Dodgers had a 4-2 lead going into the final inning, before the Giants tied the game and then went ahead, gaining the trip to the World Series.  
Born: Tommy Lee (stage name for Thomas Lee Bass), American musician; in Athens, Greece

October 4, 1962 (Thursday)
The National Assembly of France voted to censure Prime Minister Georges Pompidou for his support of the direct election of the President, with 280 in favor in the 480 member body.  Pompidou resigned the next day, but would stay on while new elections were scheduled.  The vote marked the only occasion, in the more than 50-year history of the Fifth Republic, that a government was brought down by a vote in Parliament.
The first nuclear missile in Cuba was installed by the Soviet Union, as a warhead was attached to an R-12 rocket.
Two Saudi Arabian pilots landed an air force training plane in upper Egypt and were granted political asylum, the second such defection in two days. 
Born: 
Marc Minkowski, French orchestral conductor; in Paris
Jon Secada, Cuban-American singer; in Havana

October 5, 1962 (Friday)
North Yemen Civil War: A battalion of Special Forces (Saaqah), sent by Egypt to act as personal guards for new leader Abdullah as-Sallal, arrived at Hodeida.
Dr. No, the first James Bond film, premiered in UK cinemas.
The Beatles released their first single, Love Me Do.
The phrase "So help me God" was added to the US Armed Forces and National Guard enlistment oaths.  the constitutionality of this change has not been ascertained, being in apparent contradiction of the No Religious Test Clause of the United States Constitution.
Mercury spacecraft 16, Sigma 7, was returned to Hanger S at Cape Canaveral for postflight work and inspection. It was planned to retain the Sigma 7 at Cape Canaveral for permanent display.
Dr. Charles A. Berry, Chief of Aerospace Medical Operations, Manned Spacecraft Center, reported that preliminary dosimeter readings indicated that astronaut Schirra had received a much smaller radiation dosage than expected.
A U.S. Air Force spokesman, Lt. Colonel Albert C. Trakowski, announced that special instruments on unidentified military test satellites had confirmed the danger that astronaut Walter M. Schirra, Jr., could have been killed if his MA-8 space flight had taken him above a  altitude. The artificial radiation belt, created by the U.S. high altitude nuclear test in July, sharply increases in density above 400-miles altitude at the geomagnetic equator and reaches peak intensities of 100 to 1,000 times normal levels at altitudes above .
McDonnell and Lockheed reported on radiation hazards and constraints for Gemini missions at a Trajectories and Orbits Coordination meeting. McDonnell's preliminary findings indicated no radiation hazard for normal Gemini operations with some shielding; with no shielding the only constraint was on the 14-day mission, which would have to be limited to an altitude of 115 nautical miles. Lockheed warned that solar flares would pose a problem at higher altitudes. Lockheed also recommended limiting operations to under  pending more data on the new radiation belts created by the Atomic Energy Commission's Project Dominic in July 1962.
Born:
Mike Conley Sr., American Olympic champion track athlete; in Chicago
Caron Keating, Northern Irish television presenter; in Fulham, London, England, to Gloria Hunniford and Don Keating (died 2004)

October 6, 1962 (Saturday)
The Chinese leadership convened to hear a report from Lin Biao that PLA intelligence units had determined that Indian units might assault Chinese positions at Thag La on 10 October (Operation Leghorn). The Chinese leaders, on recommendation of the Central Military Council decided to launch a large-scale attack to punish perceived military aggression from India, resulting in the Sino-Indian War.  
The U.S. Committee on Overhead Reconnaissance pointed out that high-altitude photographs of Cuba had not been taken of the western end of the island since August 29, and recommended to the White House that U-2 overflights be made there to determine whether Soviet missiles were being put in place. Flights over west Cuba on October 14 would confirm the presence of offensive missiles.
The U.S. Marine Corps and U.S. Navy suffered their first helicopter fatalities in Vietnam when a Marine Corps UH-34 Seahorse crashed 15 miles (24 km) from Tam Ky, South Vietnam, killing five Marines and two Navy personnel.
The last foreign military personnel, including advisers of the U.S. Special Forces, left Laos in accordance with the 75-day period specified in the July 23 "Declaration on the Neutrality of Laos".
Died:
Sylvia Beach, 75, American-French author
Tod Browning, 81, American film director 
Tom Slick, 46, Texas oil millionaire and philanthropist, died in a plane crash

October 7, 1962 (Sunday)
The cabinet of Iran approved the "Law of Regional and State Associations", extending voting for, and service on, local councils to non-Muslims and females, with the only requirement being that a voter or officeholder believe in one of the "revealed religions". After protests by the Shi'ite Ayatollahs, the law was annulled on November 29.
Venezuela's President Romulo Betancourt issued Resolution #9, suspending constitutional rights and restricting freedom of the press.
The Mercury-Atlas 8 (MA-8) press conference was held at the Rice University, Houston, Texas. Astronaut Wally Schirra expressed his belief that the spacecraft was ready for the 1-day mission, that he experienced absolutely no difficulties with his better than 9 hours of weightlessness, and that the flight was of the "textbook" variety.
In an episode of Candid Camera broadcast on this date, veteran comedian Buster Keaton posed as a gas station attendant cleaning customers' windshields.
Died:  
Clem Miller, 45, U.S. Representative from California, was killed along with two other people when his airplane crashed in bad weather near Crescent City, California. Miller was on a trip as part of his campaign for re-election and died along with his 13-year-old son and the pilot. Since it was too late to name a new candidate, Miller's name remained on the ballot and received the most votes.
Henri Oreiller, 36, French alpine ski racer, was killed when his Ferrari crashed at the Linas-Montlhéry autodrome.

October 8, 1962 (Monday)
1962 North Korean parliamentary election: North Korean voters went to the polls to vote "yes" or "no" on the 383 candidates for the 383 seats parliament in each district. The Pyongyang government announced a 100 percent turnout (breaking the 1957 record of 99.99%) and 100 percent approval of the candidates (beating 99.92% in 1957); the 100% turnout and approval reports would follow the 1967, 1972, 1977, 1982 and 1986 votes, though in 1992, reported turnout was only 99.85%, albeit still with the 100% approval.
The wreck of the Bremen cog, a ship built in 1380 when the area was ruled by the Hanseatic League, was discovered in the Weser River during dredging operations.
The October 10 edition of the West German magazine Der Spiegel reached newsstands, with the article "Bedingt abwehrbereit" by Conrad Ahlers, about the Bundeswehr's poor preparedness, causing the so-called Spiegel affair.
Algeria was accepted into the United Nations.
Hurricane Daisy struck the Canadian province of Nova Scotia.

October 9, 1962 (Tuesday)
The MCC cricket team arrived in Fremantle, Western Australia, to begin its 1962–63 tour.
The nation of Uganda became independent within the Commonwealth of Nations, with Milton Obote as the first Prime Minister, and the white British colonial administrator, Sir Walter Coutts, as the first Governor-General. The following year, Uganda would become a republic, and Coutts would be replaced by a President, the former Bugandan King Edward Mutesa II.
At a military parade in the Polish city of Szczecin, a T-54 tank of the Polish People's Army hit a crowd of bystanders, killing seven children and injuring others.
Twenty-eight people were killed, and 62 injured, when the southbound Moscow-Vienna-Rome "Chopin Express" train collided with the northbound Budapest-Warsaw train that had derailed near Warsaw.
Mercury spacecraft 20 was delivered to Cape Canaveral for the Mercury-Atlas 9 (MA-9) 1-day mission.

October 10, 1962 (Wednesday)

The Sino-Indian War began as Chinese troops opened fire on Indian troops and a battle on the border of the world's two largest nations began. India reported its losses at six dead and seven missing from the first day of fighting, with 11 wounded, while China reported more than 30 casualties.
Anaasa won the 4.30, the last race ever to be run at Hurst Park Racecourse, Surrey, before the course was sold and re-developed.
Died: Edmund H. Hansen, 67, American Academy Award-winning sound engineer

October 11, 1962 (Thursday)

The Second Vatican Council opened, under Pope John XXIII. The 2,500 bishops in attendance walked in a procession through St. Peter's Square and into the Basilica as part of the opening ceremonies. Pope John would pass away the following year, and the last session of the Council would be closed by Pope Paul VI on December 8, 1965.
Born: Joan Cusack, American actress; in Evanston, Illinois

October 12, 1962 (Friday)
On his way from Chennai to a visit to Sri Lanka, India's Prime Minister Jawaharlal Nehru remarked to reporters that his government had directed the Indian Army "to free our territory in the Northeast frontier", implying, incorrectly, that India had decided to engage China in a full-scale war. On October 14, China's paper People's Daily would quote Nehru and tell its readers to expect an invasion of China by India. One author would later write, "Nehru's casual statement only served to precipitate the Chinese attack on India."
Associate Director Walter C. Williams of Manned Spacecraft Center (MSC) invited top-level managers from all major government and contractor organizations participating in the Gemini program to become members of a Project Gemini Management Panel. These invitations had arisen from discussions between Williams and MSC Director Robert R. Gilruth on the inevitable problems of program management and technical development. The panel, chaired by George M. Low, Director, Spacecraft and Flight Missions, Office of Manned Space Flight, met first on November 13, 1962. In addition to NASA and Air Force representatives, the panel membership included vice presidents of McDonnell, Martin, Aerospace, Aerojet-General, and Lockheed. A similar development-management structure had worked well in Project Mercury, minimizing delays in communication and providing fast reactions to problems.
Columbus Day Storm of 1962: Typhoon Freda hit Victoria, British Columbia, and other locations on the west coast of North America. At Oregon's Cape Blanco, an anemometer (minus one of its cups) registered wind gusts in excess of 145 mph (233 km/h); some reports put the peak velocity at 179 mph (288 km/h). The resultant damage was estimated at around $230 million to $280 million for California, Oregon and Washington combined.
The Bridge of the Americas opened in Panama, exactly three years after construction began. October 12 was chosen for the start and finish of construction in honor of the October 12, 1492, landfall of Christopher Columbus.   
Jazz bassist/composer Charles Mingus gave a disastrous concert at Town Hall, New York City. Earlier in the day, Mingus had punched Jimmy Knepper in the mouth while the two men were working together at Mingus's apartment, with the result that Knepper was unable to perform.
Born: Amanda Castro, Honduran poet; in Tegucigalpa (died 2010)
Died: Alberto Teisaire, 71, former Vice President of Argentina

October 13, 1962 (Saturday)
Edward Albee's first full-length play, Who's Afraid of Virginia Woolf? opened on Broadway, starring Uta Hagen as Martha and Arthur Hill as George.
Anti-apartheid activist Helen Joseph became the first person to be placed under house arrest under South Africa's new anti-sabotage law.  
Oakland, California, set an all-time calendar day record with 4.52 inches (11.5 cm) of rain, resulting from the previous night's storm. 
A treaty between France and the tiny principality of Monaco took effect, with the objective of stopping the practice by wealthy French citizens of moving their residence to Monaco to avoid high taxes.  Under Article 7, any French person who had not been "habitually resident in Monaco for five years" would be required to pay French taxes.
Born: Jerry Rice, American NFL wide receiver, Pro Football Hall of Famer; in Starkville, Mississippi

October 14, 1962 (Sunday)
Flying a U-2 spyplane over the area around San Cristóbal, Cuba, Colonel Richard S. Heyser took 928 photographs in the space of six minutes. The pictures would reveal that four mobile Soviet missile launchers, capable of firing the SS-4 medium range nuclear missile, had been placed in western Cuba. Other flights would eventually locate 42 nuclear missiles at ten sites in Cuba.

October 15, 1962 (Monday)
The National Committee of Liberation, an anti-apartheid paramilitary organization in South Africa, destroyed an electrical transformer to cause a blackout in Johannesburg in the most effective sabotage act by the NCL up to that time.
At the National Photographic Interpretation Center (NPIC), analysis of the 928 images, taken the day before by the U-2 over flight, showed that offensive missiles and launchers had been placed in Cuba.
A high frequency direction finding system study was initiated for Project Mercury. This study, covering a 12-month period, involved the development of high-frequency direction finding techniques to be applied in a network for locating spacecraft. The program was divided into a 5-month study and feasibility phase, followed by a 7-month program to provide operational tests of the procedures during actual Mercury flights or follow-on operations.
Walter Schirra was awarded the NASA Distinguished Service Medal by James E. Webb, NASA Administrator, for his six-orbit Mercury-Atlas 8 (MA-8) flight in a ceremony at his hometown, Oradell, New Jersey.
NASA awarded a contract to International Business Machines Corporation to provide the ground-based computer system for Projects Gemini and Apollo. The contract cost was $36,200,018. The computer complex would be part of the Integrated Mission Control Center at Manned Spacecraft Center, Houston.
The Canadian Broadcasting Corporation  (CBC) debuted a new children's television program on its nationwide affiliates, Misterogers, described initially in CBC's fall schedule preview as "a 15-minute puppet show" shown three days a week. Hosted by Fred Rogers, the show would soon be described as "one of the freshest, most intelligent puppet shows to come along in quite a while." The host had appeared on Pittsburgh as a local offering when educational television station WQED went on the air on April 1, 1954 with Children's Corner and had continued until 1957 as "the community-educational station's most original and popular show".
Born:  
Morten Abel, Norwegian pop musician; in Bodø 
Per-Erik Burud, Norwegian billionaire entrepreneur and CEO of the Kiwi grocery store chain; in Drammen (d. 2011)
Yasutoshi Nishimura, Minister of State for Economic and Fiscal Policy for Japan in Prime Minister Yoshihide Suga's government; in Akashi, Hyogo Prefecture

October 16, 1962 (Tuesday)
Arthur C. Lundahl, the director of the NPIC, informed CIA Director John McCone of the results of Mission 3101, reporting the discovery of medium-range ballistic missile (MRBM) sites, discovering that photographs had "revealed an MRBM Launch Site and two new military encampments located along the southern edge of the Sierra del Rosario in west central Cuba". National Security Adviser McGeorge Bundy then woke up President Kennedy to advise him that missiles were in Cuba but were not yet operational. Kennedy ordered 17 military, political and diplomatic advisers, the ExComm, to assemble at the White House at 11:50 a.m.
Walter Schirra became the fifth member of the Project Mercury team to receive Astronaut Wings.
The New York Yankees beat the San Francisco Giants, 1-0, to win the seventh and deciding game of the 1962 World Series.
Died: Princess Helen of Serbia, 77, former Serbian/Yugoslavian princess, daughter of King Peter I and sister of King Alexander I

October 17, 1962 (Wednesday)
The Soviet Union increased its spying capability with the launch of the Kosmos 10 satellite. For the first time, satellites had four cameras that were capable of being moved in order to obtain three-dimensional images.
The British International Motor Show opened at Earl's Court in London. The Triumph Spitfire was among new vehicles showcased during the event.
Nick Holonyak, Jr., and S. F. Bevacqua, both engineers with the General Electric Company, announced their discovery of the physical process that would make the light emitting diode— the LED — practical, by submitting their paper "Coherent (Visible) Light Emission from Ga(As1−xPx) Junctions" to the weekly journal Applied Physics Letters, which would publish the work in its December 1 issue. Although silicon diodes had been able to generate light on the infrared spectrum, it took a specific alloy of gallium (Ga), arsenic (As) and phosphorus (P) to generate visible light; initially, LEDs were limited to red light, but the GaAsP system would later be perfected with nitrates to produce other primary colors, making it possible to generate the full spectrum.
The Canadian city of Edmonton held municipal elections.
Joseph F. Shea, Deputy Director for Systems, Office of Manned Space Flight, solicited suggestions from each of the NASA Headquarters' Program Offices and the various NASA Centers on the potential uses and experiments for a crewed space station. Such ideas, Shea explained, would help determine whether adequate justification existed for such a space laboratory, either as a research center in space or as a functional satellite. Preliminary studies already conducted, he said, placed such spacecraft within the realm of technology feasibility, and, if a decision were made to go ahead with such a project, NASA could conceivably place a station in Earth orbit by about 1967. Shea emphasized, however, that any such decision depended to a great extent on whether adequate justification existed for a space station. In seeking out ideas from within the agency, Shea called for roles, configurations, system designs, and specific scientific and engineering uses and requirements, emphasizing (1) the importance of a space station program to science, technology, or national goals; and (2) the unique characteristics of such a station and why such a program could not be accomplished by using Mercury, Gemini, Apollo, or uncrewed spacecraft. Finally, he stated that general objectives currently envisioned for a station were as a precursor to crewed planetary missions and for broad functional and scientific roles.
Born:  
Mike Judge, American animator, producer and voice actor; in Guayaquil, Ecuador
Kathryn Paterson, Chief Censor of New Zealand 1994-1999; in Umina, New South Wales, Australia (d. 1999)
Yvon Pouliquen, French footballer and manager; in Morlaix
Died: Mogok Sayadaw (Venerable Sayadawgyi U Wimala), 62, Burmese Theravada Buddhist monk and vipassana meditation master

October 18, 1962 (Thursday)
U.S. President Kennedy and Secretary of State Dean Rusk met at the White House with Soviet Foreign Minister Andrei Gromyko and Soviet Ambassador to the U.S. Anatoly Dobrynin.  Gromyko told Kennedy that Soviet operations in Cuba were purely defensive, and Kennedy did not tell Gromyko that the U.S. had discovered that the Soviets had nuclear missiles in Cuba.
The Politburo of the Chinese Communist Party approved plans for General Zhang Guohua to lead the People's Liberation Army to launch a large "self-defensive counterattack on India, to take place on October 20.
Born: Min Ko Naing, Burmese student leader and political dissident; in Yangon

October 19, 1962 (Friday)
Anime pioneer Tatsuo Yoshida founded the company Tatsunoko Production in Tokyo.
President Kennedy met with the Joint Chiefs of Staff to discuss the military options for responding to the missiles in Cuba. USAF Chief of Staff General Curtis LeMay advocated bombing of the missile sites in Cuba, while Defense Secretary Robert McNamara recommended a blockade of ships approaching the island. Ultimately, Kennedy, who would spend the day at scheduled speeches in Ohio and Illinois, would opt to blockade Cuba rather than to start a war.
McDonnell Aircraft Corporation reported that all spacecraft system tests had been completed for spacecraft 20, which was allocated for the Mercury-Atlas 9 (MA-9) 1-day orbital mission.
Wesley L. Hjornevik, Manned Spacecraft Center (MSC) Assistant Director for Administration, described to members of MSC's senior staff the implications of NASA Headquarters' recent decision to cut the MSC budget for fiscal year 1963 from $687 million to $660 million, the entire reduction to be borne by the Gemini program. Hjornevik feared that the Gemini budget, already tight, could absorb so large a cut only by dropping the paraglider, Agena, and all rendezvous equipment from the program. Gemini Project Office (GPO) reported that funding limitations had already forced Martin and McDonnell to reduce their level of activity. The first Gemini flight (uncrewed) was rescheduled for December 1963, with the second (crewed) to follow three months later, and subsequent flights at two-month intervals, with the first Agena (fifth mission) in August or September 1964. This four-month delay imposed by budget limitations required a large-scale reprogramming of Gemini development work, reflected chiefly in drastic reduction in the scale of planned test programs. Details of the necessary reprogramming had been worked out by December 20, when GPO Manager James A. Chamberlin reported that December 1963 was a realistic date for the first Gemini flight. Gemini funding for fiscal year 1963 totaled $232.8 million.
Born: Evander Holyfield, American boxer, undisputed World Heavyweight champion 1990-92, World Boxing Association champion three times between 1993 and 2001; in Atmore, Alabama

October 20, 1962 (Saturday)
In the Sino-Indian War, a force of 30,000 Chinese troops stopped Indian troops' invasion and overran the outnumbered Indian force that had been ordered into the disputed area. Within days the Chinese Army had gained control of five bridges over the Namkha Chu River and by October 28 were  inside India's territory. The first wave of attacks began at 5:00 a.m. Indian Standard Time, thirty minutes after Chinese radio broadcast an announcement of the victory. The populations of the two nations (670 million for China and 450 million for India) represented one-third of the world's three billion people in 1962, prompting Newsweek magazine to headline an article in its October 29 edition, "A Third of the World at War". During the week that followed, it appeared that the number might increase to half of the world at war, with the Soviet Union (210 million) and the United States (180 million) in a showdown over Cuba, potentially bringing the total to 1.5 billion people at war in the world's four largest nations.
Both the United States and the Soviet Union conducted high-altitude nuclear tests, already scheduled, even as U.S. President Kennedy was deciding on a confrontation between the two nations over the missiles in Cuba. The US exploded a weapon  over the Pacific Ocean, and the USSR followed two days later with a blast  over Kazakhstan. The Joint Chiefs of Staff raised the nuclear alert status to DEFCON 3.

October 21, 1962 (Sunday)
Ranger 5, a spacecraft designed to transmit pictures of the lunar surface to Earth stations during a period of 10 minutes of flight prior to impacting on the Moon, malfunctioned, ran out of power and ceased operation, having passed within  of the Moon.
The Norwegian passenger ship MV Sanct Svithun ran aground off the Vikna Islands. The ship was refloated, but then sank, killing 33 of the 79 people on board.
The 1962 Seattle World's Fair (officially, the "Century 21 Exposition") closed in Seattle after a six-month run.

October 22, 1962 (Monday)
At 7:00 pm Washington time, U.S. President John F. Kennedy announced in a nationally broadcast address that "unmistakable evidence has established the fact that a series of offensive missile sites" had been established in Cuba by the Soviet Union "to provide a nuclear strike capability against the Western Hemisphere". He announced "a strict quarantine on offensive military equipment under shipment to Cuba" and warned that any launch of a nuclear missile from Cuba would require "a full retaliatory response upon the Soviet Union." Kennedy implored, "I call upon Chairman Khrushchev to halt and eliminate this clandestine, reckless and provocative threat to world peace and to stable relations between our nations."
Colonel Oleg Penkovsky, who had secretly been passing Soviet secrets to the United Kingdom, was arrested by the KGB.  He would be convicted of treason and executed on May 16, 1963. 
The city of Eden Prairie, Minnesota, a suburb in the Minneapolis-St. Paul metropolitan area, was incorporated.

October 23, 1962 (Tuesday)
"Spiegel affair": Rudolf Augstein, the publisher of the West German news magazine Der Spiegel, was arrested along with Assistant Chief Editor Conrad Ahlers on charges of treason after the magazine's October 10 issue had published information about the NATO maneuver "Fallex 62", and concluded that the West German military was poorly prepared to defend against an invasion. Other arrests followed, leading to protests by West Germans against the suppression of freedom of the press; Augstein and Ahlers would be released on February 7, 1963.
As the American blockade of Cuba from Soviet ships was set, the 450 ships of the U.S. Atlantic Fleet and 200,000 personnel prepared for a confrontation, including defense if the Soviets tried an airlift over the blockade. The Soviet freighter Polotavia was identified as the first ship that would reach the quarantine line.
Major General Leighton Davis, Department of Defense representative for Project Mercury Support Operations, reported that support operation planning was underway for the Mercury 1-day mission.
The Air Force Missile Test Center, Cape Canaveral, Florida, submitted a report to the Secretary of Defense, Robert McNamara, summarizing Department of Defense support during the Mercury-Atlas 8 (MA-8) six-orbit mission.
Art Blakey began recording Caravan at the Plaza Sound Studio in New York City, his first album for Riverside Records, with whom he had signed earlier in the month.

October 24, 1962 (Wednesday)
The U.S. Navy blockade against Soviet ships began at 10:00 a.m. Washington D.C. time (1500 hrs UTC and 6:00 p.m. in Moscow).  Some of the Cuban-bound Soviet freighters altered their courses to avoid the confrontation, while others proceeded.
Mars 2MV-4 No.1 (or Sputnik 22) was launched by the Soviet Union, with the intention of making a flyby of the planet Mars and transmitting back images to the earth.  When the engines were reignited in order to take the probe from parking orbit toward Mars, the satellite exploded, and debris fell to earth for the next four months.
James Brown recorded his Live at the Apollo album.

October 25, 1962 (Thursday)
Tropical Storm Harriet was first observed by the Joint Typhoon Warning Center, just off the east coast of Thailand. It crossed into the Indian Ocean, and, during landfall its storm surge, flooded the Laem Talumphuk peninsula in Nakhon Si Thammarat Province. Typhoon Harriet killed 769 people, with another 142 missing and 252 seriously injured.
Abdul Monem Khan was appointed as the Governor of East Pakistan by Pakistan's President, Muhammad Ayub Khan. During his rule from 1962 to 1968, Governor Monem Khan's strict rule of the more than 60,000,000 East Pakistan residents eventually led to the province separating from the rest of Pakistan as the nation of Bangladesh.
At 6:50 a.m., the American destroyers  and the  made the first enforcement of the blockade, stopping and boarding the Soviet-chartered ship Marcula,  from Cuba. After spending two hours searching the Marcula and determining that its cargo of trucks, paper, sulfur and auto parts provided no threat, the Navy allowed the ship to proceed with its cargo.

At a meeting of the United Nations Security Council, American Ambassador Adlai Stevenson confronted Soviet Ambassador Valerian Zorin with photographs of missile sites in Cuba and angrily asked, "Do you, Ambassador Zorin, deny that the USSR has placed and is placing medium and intermediate range missiles and sites in Cuba? Yes or no? Don't wait for the translation. Yes or no?" Zorin laughed and then said, "I am not in an American courtroom, sir, and therefore I do not wish to answer a question that is put to me in the fashion in which a prosecutor puts questions. In due course, you will have your reply."
Uganda was admitted to membership of the United Nations.
NASA Associate Administrator Robert C. Seamans, Jr., presented Outstanding Leadership Awards to Maxime A. Faget, Assistant Director for Engineering and Development, Manned Spacecraft Center, and George B. Graves, Jr., Assistant Director for Information and Control Systems. Also, at the NASA annual awards ceremony the Administrator, James E. Webb, presented Group Achievement Awards to four Manned Spacecraft Center activities: Assistant Directorate for Engineering and Development, Preflight Operations Division, Mercury Project Office, and Flight Operations Division.
Manned Spacecraft Center informed Lockheed that Gemini program budget readjustments required reprogramming the Gemini-Agena program. Subsequent meetings on November 2 and November 20 worked out the changes necessary to implement the Agena program at minimum cost. The overall test program for the Agena and its propulsion systems was significantly reduced, but in general neither the scope nor the requirements of the Agena program were altered. The major result of the reprogramming was a four-month slip in the scheduled launch date of the first Agena (to September 1964); this delay was about a month and a half less than had been anticipated when reprogramming began. In addition, Lockheed was to continue its program at a reduced level through the rest of 1962, a period of about six weeks, and to resume its normal level of activity on January 1, 1963.
Born: Borys Kolesnikov, Deputy Prime Minister of Ukraine, 2010-2012; in Zhdanov, Ukrainian SSR, Soviet Union (now  Mariupol, Ukraine)

October 26, 1962 (Friday)
The first ever proclamation of a state of emergency in India was made by President Sarvepalli Radhakrishnan as Chinese troops continued their invasion. The emergency would not be rescinded until January 10, 1968. A state of emergency would be proclaimed two other times in the 20th century, on December 3, 1971, and on June 25, 1975.
Born: Cary Elwes, English actor; in Westminster, the son of Dominick Elwes and Tessa Georgina Kennedy
Died: Louise Beavers, 60, American film actress

October 27, 1962 (Saturday)

At 11:19 am Washington time, USAF Major Rudolf Anderson became the only combatant fatality of the Cuban Missile Crisis when his U-2 airplane was shot down by a surface-to-air missile while he was flying over Cuba. Soviet Army Major Ivan Gerchenov had been ordered to fire missiles, from a station near the city of Banes, at "Target Number 33". On the other hand, Fidel Castro would say in 1964 that the Cubans, not the Soviets, had fired the missile, and a former Castro aide, Carlos Franqui, would write in 1984 that Castro himself had pushed the button to launch the missile. The Joint Chiefs recommended to President John F. Kennedy that the U.S. should attack Cuba within 36 hours to destroy the Soviet missiles. At Washington, General Taylor recommended an air attack on the Banes site, but immediate action was not taken.
Hours later, the Soviet submarine B-59 was detected by U.S. Navy destroyers in the Atlantic Ocean, and one of the ships began dropping explosive depth charges to force the sub to surface. Thirty years later, a communications intelligence officer on the B-59 would report that Captain Valentin Savitsky ordered a nuclear-armed torpedo to be armed for firing at the U.S. ships, and that the second-in-command, Vasily Arkhipov, persuaded Savitsky to surface instead.
Heart of Midlothian F.C. defeated Kilmarnock F.C. 1-0 in the 1962 Scottish League Cup Final at Hampden Park, Glasgow.

October 28, 1962 (Sunday)
The Cuban Missile Crisis came to an end when, at 5:00 pm Moscow time (10:00 am in Washington), Radio Moscow broadcast the text of the message from Soviet Prime Minister Nikita Khrushchev to U.S. President John F. Kennedy.  "Dear Mr. President," Khrushchev's letter began, "I have received your message of October 27. I express my satisfaction and thank you for the sense of proportion you have displayed and for realization of the responsibility which now devolves on you for the preservation of the peace of the world."  Khrushchev went on to say, "I regard with great understanding your concern and the concern of the United States people in connection with the fact that the weapons you describe as offensive are formidable weapons indeed. Both you and we understand what kind of weapons these are.  In order to eliminate as rapidly as possible the conflict which endangers the cause of peace, to give an assurance to all people who crave peace, and to reassure the American people, who, I am certain, also want peace, as do the people of the Soviet Union, the Soviet Government, in addition to earlier instructions on the discontinuation of further work on weapons construction sites, has given a new order to dismantle the arms which you described as offensive, and to crate and return them to the Soviet Union."  In an agreement worked out by Khrushchev and Kennedy with the assistance of U.N. Secretary-General U Thant, the U.S. pledged not to invade Cuba, and to remove Jupiter missiles that had been placed in Turkey near its border with the U.S.S.R.
In France, a referendum was held to decide on the election of the President of France through universal suffrage.  The proposal for constitutional change was approved by 62.25% of those voting.
The ferry SS Lisieux caught fire on a voyage between Newhaven, East Sussex (UK) and Dieppe (France), and was escorted into Dieppe at reduced speed.
A. J. Foyt won the Golden State 100 motor race at California State Fairgrounds Race Track.

October 29, 1962 (Monday)
The British airline East Anglian Flying Services was renamed Channel Airways.
The bodies of Lt. Günther Mollenhauer, and several other Germans shot down over the UK during the Second World War, were disinterred from a local cemetery for re-burial at Cannock Chase German war cemetery.
Died: 
George Matthew Adams, 84, American journalist and newspaper proprietor
Amy Otis Earhart, 93, mother of Amelia Earhart
Einar Gundersen, 66, Norwegian footballer who scored 26 goals for the Norway national team

October 30, 1962 (Tuesday)
Tropical Storm Harriet hit Bangladesh, shortly prior to dissipating.
United Nations Secretary-General U Thant arrived in Havana for a two-day visit to meet with Fidel Castro, and the two conferred the same day for more than two hours in order to pursue the UN's goal of defusing the Cuban Missile Crisis. At U Thant's request, the United States lifted its blockade of Cuba for 48 hours and discontinued overflights for the same period.
The United Nations General Assembly voted overwhelmingly against membership for the People's Republic of China, with only 42 of the 110 members supporting the resolution. The final vote was 42 for, 56 against, and 12 abstaining.
NASA announced realignment of functions within the office of Associate Administrator Robert C. Seamans, Jr. D. Brainerd Holmes assumed new duties as a Deputy Associate Administrator of Manned Space Flight. NASA field installations engaged primarily in human spaceflight (Marshall Space Flight Center, Manned Spacecraft Center, and Launch Operations Center) would report to Holmes; installations engaged principally in other projects (Ames, Lewis Research Center, Langley Research Center, Goddard Space Flight Center, Jet Propulsion Laboratory, and Wallops Island) would report to Thomas F. Dixon, Deputy Associate Administrator for the past year. Previously, most field center directors had reported directly to Dr. Seamans on institutional matters beyond program and contractural administration.
On the eve of Halloween, Deputy U.S. Attorney General Nicholas Katzenbach arrived at the University of Mississippi in Oxford and told students that anyone caught harassing James Meredith would be subject to arrest and an appearance in federal court for contempt of court. The unusual action came the day after "a firecracker barrage" was made on the dormitory where Meredith, the only African-American student to be enrolled at Ole Miss. Earlier, someone had smashed the window of a car in which Meredith was riding with four United States Marshals.

October 31, 1962 (Wednesday)
Jawaharlal Nehru, Prime Minister of India, temporarily took on the role of Minister of Defence, following the resignation of V. K. Krishna Menon.
The apogee of the basic Gemini spacecraft orbit model was set at 167 nautical miles, the perigee of the elliptical orbit at 87. The altitude of the circular orbit of the Agena target vehicle was to be 161 nautical miles.
Died: Thomas Holenstein, 66, Swiss politician who served as Switzerland's head of state in 1951/1952 as President of the Swiss National Council

References

External links

1962
1962-10
1962-10